Wabag Rural LLG is a local-level government (LLG) of Enga Province, Papua New Guinea.

Wards
01. Tukusanda
02. Aipanda
03. Tambitanis
04. Lakolam
05. Kupalis
06. Nandi
07. Sakarip
08. Sopas
09. Kiwi
10. Kaiap
11. Kamas
12. Kopen
13. Sari
14. Tore
15. Teremanda
16. Aipinamanda
17. Lakemanda
18. Sakales
19. Keas
20. Irelya
21. Wakumare
22. Lenki
23. Ainumanda
24. Rakamanda
25. Yokomanda
26. Imi
27. We'e
28. Birip
29. Akom
30. Lukirap
31. Waimerimanda
32. Lakopen
33. Yailingis
34. Tumbilam
35. Aiyokolam
36. Keas
37. Komaites
38. Kiwi No.2
39. Amala
40. Manjope
41. Pandam
42. Wanomanda
43. Makapumanda
44. Yokota
45. Pealam

References

Local-level governments of Enga Province